Haderbad-e Olya (also Romanized as Hāderbād-e ‘Olyā; also known as Hāderbād, Hāderābād, Haidarābād, and Ḩeydarābād) is a village in Alqurat Rural District, in the Central District of Birjand County, South Khorasan Province, Iran. At the 2006 census, its population was 76, in 21 families.

References 

Populated places in Birjand County